'
Hossein Mahdavy' is an Iranian economist and political scientist known for rentier state theory. After Mahdavy's work on rentier states, rentierism became a common conception for analyzing some developing states like Saudi Arabia, Iran, Iraq, Kuwait, Qatar, UAE and Venezuela.

He studied at Oxford and Harvard Universities

References 

https://www.adst.org/OH%20TOCs/Miller,%20William%20Green.toc.pdf 

Iranian economists
Year of birth missing (living people)
Living people